Microgiton is a genus of moths in the subfamily Arctiinae. The genus was described by Felder in 1874.

Species
 Microgiton eos H. Druce
 Microgiton submacula Walker, 1854

References

External links

Arctiinae